Peppino, le modelle e chella là is a 1957 Italian comedy film directed by Mario Mattoli and starring Gino Bramieri.

Cast
 Gino Bramieri
 Peppino De Filippo
 Franco Di Trocchio
 Fulvia Franco
 Giacomo Furia
 Salvo Libassi
 Guido Martufi
 Ester Masing
 Violetta Nardon
 Teddy Reno
 Giulia Rubini
 Massimo Serato
 Renato Terra
 Attilio Tosato
 Paolo Zitelli

References

External links

1957 films
1957 comedy films
1950s Italian-language films
Italian black-and-white films
Italian comedy films
Films directed by Mario Mattoli
Films set in Rome
Films shot in Rome
1950s Italian films